Kreuzberg is a German word that means "cross mountain" and may refer to:

Places

Cities and towns 
 Kreuzberg, a former borough, now a locality of Berlin, Germany
 Friedrichshain-Kreuzberg, a borough of Berlin, Germany, formed in 2001 by merging the former boroughs of Friedrichshain and Kreuzberg
 Kreuzberg (Ahr), a locality of Altenahr, Germany
 The German name for the town of Krucemburk, Czech Republic
 The German name for the village of Kružberk, Czech Republic

Mountains, hills and passes 
 Kreuzberg (Bavarian Prealps), a mountain in the Bavarian Prealps, Germany
 Kreuzberg (Rhön), a mountain in the Rhön, Germany
 Kreuzberg (Tempelhofer Berge), a hill forming part of the Tempelhofer Berge range, Berlin, Germany, name-giving for the former borough of Berlin
 Kreuzbergpass, a mountain pass between the Carnic Alps and the Dolomites
 Kreuzbergsattel, a mountain pass in the Austrian Alps

Other uses
 "Kreuzberg", a song by Bloc Party from the album A Weekend in the City
 König von Kreuzberg, a German television series
 Liebling Kreuzberg, a German television series
 Kreuzberg, a Polish rock band

See also 
 Creuzburg (disambiguation)
 Kreutzberg (disambiguation)
 Kreuzburg (disambiguation)